Euphorbia griffithii, the Griffith's spurge, is a species of flowering plant in the spurge family Euphorbiaceae, native to Bhutan, Tibet and south west China. In summer it produces flowerheads (cyathia) of brilliant red and yellow.

It is a vigorous plant, and can be invasive.  Numerous cultivars have been selected for garden use, including 'Dixter' and ‘Fireglow”. 

The Latin specific epithet griffithii refers to William Griffith (1810-1845), a British naturalist and botanist.

References

griffithii
Taxa named by Joseph Dalton Hooker